Tony Pawson is the name of:

 Anthony Pawson (1952–2013), scientist
 Tony Pawson (cricketer) (1921–2012), English cricketer and cricket journalist